Henry McKinley "Mickey" Michaux Jr. (born September 4, 1930) is an American civil rights activist and Democratic member of the North Carolina General Assembly. He represented the state's thirty-first House district from 1983 to 2019 and previously served from 1973 through 1977. The district included constituents in Durham County. Upon his retirement, Michaux was the longest-serving member of the North Carolina General Assembly. In the 2007-2008 session, Michaux served as senior chairman of the House Appropriations Committee and chairman of the House Select Committee on Street Gang Prevention.

In 2020, at age 89, Michaux was appointed to fill a seat in the North Carolina Senate temporarily, following the resignation of Sen. Floyd McKissick, Jr.

Personal life
Henry M. Michaux Jr. was born on September 4, 1930 to Henry M. Michaux and Isadore M. Coates in Durham, North Carolina, United States.

Representative Michaux and his wife June have two children, Jocelyn and Cicero. He and his wife currently reside in Durham, North Carolina.

Education

In 1948, Michaux attended Alice Freeman Palmer Memorial Institute in Sedalia, North Carolina. He later went on to attend North Carolina Central University in Durham, North Carolina, where he received both his Bachelor of Science in Biology in 1952 and his Doctor of Jurisprudence (JD) in 1964. Representative Michaux also did some graduate work in physiology and biochemistry at Rutgers University in New Jersey and in Business Administration and Economics at North Carolina Central University. He holds an Honorary Doctor of Laws from North Carolina Central University as well.

Career
An attorney and businessman, Michaux is a native of Durham, North Carolina and an alumnus of Durham's North Carolina Central University. He served in the United States Army Medical Corps from 1952–1954 and in the Army Reserves from 1954 until 1960. In the 1950s, Michaux became involved with the civil rights movement, and established a close friendship with Martin Luther King Jr. After serving as an assistant district attorney, he was elected to the North Carolina House of Representatives in 1972, having gone into politics at King's suggestion. In 1977, Michaux became the first black United States Attorney in the South since Reconstruction when he was appointed to head the office in the Middle District of North Carolina. Following the confirmation of his appointment, Michaux resigned from the House of Representatives on July 18, 1977. Leaving the attorney's office at the end of the Carter administration, Michaux ran for Congress in 1982. He returned to the state legislature in 1983.

He is currently still a practicing attorney and is partner at Michaux and Michaux Practicing Attorneys which was established in 1970. Michaux is the current Vice President of Union Insurance and Realty Company and has held this position since 1955.

Runoff election threshold 

Michaux polled the most votes in the first round of the 1982 Democratic primary for Congress, but because no candidate received more than 50 percent of the vote, he was forced into a runoff with Tim Valentine. Valentine won the runoff, and Michaux returned to the state legislature. There, he pushed for the elimination of primary runoffs, and eventually the law was changed to lower the threshold to winning 40 percent to avoid a runoff. Had that law been in place and Michaux won the general election in 1982, he would have been the first African-American elected to Congress from North Carolina in the twentieth century.

In 1992, Michaux lost the Democratic primary in the new 12th congressional district to Mel Watt.

Awards and accolades

Representative Michaux was inducted into the Black College Alumni Hall of Fame in 2011. His contributions have also been recognized by North Carolina Central University, which renamed its School of Education in his honor in 2007. Michaux has served three terms as the National President of the NCCU Alumni Association as well as terms as a member of the Board of Trustees and the Board of Directors of the NCCU Foundation, Inc.

In November 2022, North Carolina Governor Roy Cooper awarded Michaux the North Carolina Award, the highest civilian honor given by the state, for his public service.

Memberships

Michaux holds memberships in the National Bar Association, North Carolina Bar Association, and the North Carolina Association of Black Lawyers.
While obtaining his undergraduate degree at North Carolina Central University, Michaux was a member of the Lampodas Club of Omega Psi Phi fraternity where he served as treasurer in 1949.

References

Works cited

External links
Official state Senate page 
North Carolina General Assembly – Representative Henry M. Michaux Jr. official NC House website
Raleigh News & Observer profile
 Oral History Interview with H. M. Michaux at Oral Histories of the American South
Project Vote Smart - Representative Henry M. 'Mickey' Michaux Jr. (NC) profile
Follow the Money - H M (Mickey) Michaux Jr
2008 2006 2004 2002 2000 1998 1996 campaign contributions

|-

|-

|-

|-

Democratic Party members of the North Carolina House of Representatives
1930 births
Living people
United States Army soldiers
African-American state legislators in North Carolina
North Carolina Central University alumni
United States Attorneys for the Middle District of North Carolina
African-American United States Army personnel
21st-century American politicians
People from Durham, North Carolina
20th-century American politicians
Candidates in the 1982 United States elections
20th-century African-American politicians
21st-century African-American politicians